Mashta Azar is a village in northwestern Syria, located west of Homs in the Wadi al-Nasarah valley, a region north of Talkalakh. According to the Syria Central Bureau of Statistics, Mashta Azar had a population of 783 in the 2004 census. Its inhabitants are predominantly Christians. The village has a Greek Orthodox Church and a Greek Catholic Church

It is a popular summer destination and tourist attraction in Syria.

References

Bibliography

 

Populated places in Talkalakh District
Eastern Orthodox Christian communities in Syria
Christian communities in Syria